The Golden Globe Award is an American accolade bestowed by the 93 members of the Hollywood Foreign Press Association (HFPA) recognizing excellence in film and television, both domestic and foreign. The annual formal ceremony and dinner at which the awards are presented are a major part of the film industry's awards season, which culminates each year with the Academy Awards.

List of ceremonies

Notes

See also
 List of black Golden Globe Award winners and nominees

References

External links
 Awards listing at IMDb

-
Golden Globe Awards ceremonies